The Chapel of the Holy Cross is a historic church at 45 Chapel Lane on the campus of Holderness School in Holderness, New Hampshire.  Built in 1884 to a design by Charles Coolidge Haight, it is a prominent regional example of Gothic Revival architecture.  The building was listed on the National Register of Historic Places in 2005.

Description and history
The Chapel of the Holy Cross occupies a prominent location near the center of the Holderness School campus, separated from New Hampshire Route 175 by the school's athletic fields.  It is a single-story brick building, with its long axis oriented east-west.  Its main entrances are on the long south side, the eastern one set facing east in a projecting brick vestibule, and the western one sheltered by a wooden porch.  The vestibule extends further to a square three-stage tower, which is topped by an octagonal steeple and cross.

The masonry Gothic Revival building was built in 1884 to a design by Charles Coolidge Haight.  It was paid for by a gift from Sarah Titus Zabriskie.  The building has undergone only modest external changes since its construction, the most notable being the 1957 enlargement of the organ wing on the north side to accommodate an organ the school had acquired from the Castle in the Clouds estate.  The chapel's 19th century stained glass windows (maker unknown, but speculated to be the New York studio of J & R Lamb) were replaced in the 1930s and 1940s, in part by original windows by the studio of Charles Jay Connick, and in part by windows that had been removed from the All Saints Church in Peterborough, and adapted to their new location by Connick.

See also
National Register of Historic Places listings in Grafton County, New Hampshire

References

Churches on the National Register of Historic Places in New Hampshire
Gothic Revival church buildings in New Hampshire
Churches completed in 1884
19th-century churches in the United States
Churches in Grafton County, New Hampshire
National Register of Historic Places in Grafton County, New Hampshire
Holderness, New Hampshire
University and college chapels in the United States